Roy Emerson Arena is a tennis stadium located in Gstaad, Switzerland.  The stadium is the centerpiece of the Suisse Open Gstaad, an ATP Tour event.  The stadium has a capacity of 4,500 spectators.  It is named in honor of Roy Emerson, 12-time Grand Slam champion, and five-time winner of the Gstaad tournament.

See also
 List of tennis stadiums by capacity

References

External links
Roy Emerson Arena

Tennis venues in Switzerland
Sports venues in the Canton of Bern